Szafrański (feminine: Szafrańska, plural form: Szafrańscy) is a Polish surname. Notable people with the surname, sometimes Szafranski and Safranski, include:
 Eddie Safranski (1918–1974), American jazz double bassist, composer & arranger
 Katarzyna Szafrańska (born 1965), Polish alpine skier
 Kurt Szafranski, in exile Safranski, (1890–1964), German-American draftsman, journalist and managing director
 Krzysztof Szafrański (born 1972), former Polish racing cyclist 
 Marcin Szafrański (born 1971), Polish alpine skier
 Rüdiger Safranski (born 1945), German philosopher and author
 Zbigniew Szafrański, Polish egyptologist

Polish-language surnames